Uncial 0248 (in the Gregory-Aland numbering), is a Greek uncial manuscript of the New Testament. Paleographically it has been assigned to the 9th century.

Description 
The codex contains the text of the Gospel of Matthew 1; 12-14; 19-21, on 70 parchment leaves (21 cm by 15.5 cm), with some lacunae. It is written in two columns per page, 24 lines per page, in uncial letters.

It is a palimpsest, twice rewritten.

Currently it is dated by the INTF to the 9th century.

Location 
Currently the codex is housed at the Bodleian Library (Auct. T. 4.21) in Oxford.

Text 
The Greek text of this codex is a representative of the Byzantine text-type. Aland placed it in Category V.

See also 

 List of New Testament uncials
 Textual criticism

References

Further reading 

 J. H. Greenlee, Nine Uncial Palimpsests of the New Testament, S & D 39 (Salt Lake City, 1968).

Greek New Testament uncials
Palimpsests
9th-century biblical manuscripts
Bodleian Library collection